John Joseph Buerger (September 19, 1870 – November 10, 1951) was an American rower who competed in the 1904 Summer Olympics. In 1904 he won the bronze medal in the coxless pairs.

References

External links
 profile

1870 births
1951 deaths
Rowers at the 1904 Summer Olympics
Olympic bronze medalists for the United States in rowing
American male rowers
Medalists at the 1904 Summer Olympics